Leila George D'Onofrio (born c. 1991/1992) is an  Australian actress.

Early life
George was born in Sydney, New South Wales, Australia, to actor and producer Vincent D'Onofrio and actress Greta Scacchi, and raised by her mother in Brighton, East Sussex, United Kingdom She has three younger half-brothers.

In 2008, she took acting classes at Brighton College. The following year, she attended Crawley College, her mother's alma mater, and in 2010, studied at the Arts Educational Schools, London. In 2011, she went to Australia to study at Sydney Film School. In 2012, she went to the United States to study at the Lee Strasberg Institute in New York City near her father.

Career
In 2013, George worked on the documentary The Last Impresario as an additional camera operator. In 2014, she starred with her mother in Anton Chekhov's The Seagull for Black Swan Theatre Company in Perth. Her mother acted as Arkadina, and she acted as Nina, Arkadina's romantic rival.

In 2016, she played the starring role in Mother, May I Sleep with Danger?, her first feature television film. She was featured in the films Mortal Engines (2018) and The Kid (2019). In 2019, George began playing the younger version of Ellen Barkin's character, Janine "Smurf" Cody, in the television series Animal Kingdom.

Personal life
George began a relationship with actor Sean Penn in 2016. They married on 30 July 2020. George filed for divorce on 15 October 2021. The divorce was finalized on 22 April 2022.

Following the 2019–20 Australian bushfires, she co-produced a celebrity fundraiser to support long-term conservation of areas affected by the bushfires; the event was hosted by the Los Angeles Zoo.

Filmography

References

External links
 
 
 

1992 births
21st-century American actresses
Actresses from Sydney
American expatriates in England
People of Lombard descent
American film actresses
American people of Australian descent
American people of English descent
American people of Italian descent
Australian expatriates in England
Australian film actresses
Australian people of American descent
Australian people of English descent
Australian people of Italian descent
Australian people of Sicilian descent
Living people
Australian expatriates in the United States